The 310 West Church Street Apartments, also known as the Ambassador Hotel, is a historic building located at 420 North Julia Street in Jacksonville, Florida, United States. On April 7, 1983, it was added to the U.S. National Register of Historic Places.

History
The structure is a brick, six-story building designed in the Georgian Revival architectural style containing Beaux-Arts elements. It opened as the upscale 310 West Church Street Apartments in 1924. Designed by Hentz, Reid and Adler architects, the building was designed in an "H"-shape to provide windows in all of the units. The main entrance is fronted by large rusticated ashlar stonework, set with a scroll keystone.

After twenty years of use, it was converted into a hotel. Its name subsequently changed several times: it was the Three-Ten Hotel in 1944, the Hotel Southland in 1947, the Griner Hotel in 1949 and in 1955, the Ambassador Hotel. In 1970, the building was purchased by Sam Easton, now a principal in the Jacksonville real estate firm Easton Sanderson & Company.

Over the years the hotel fell into disrepair as Jacksonville's downtown went into decline. The building was added to the National Register of Historic Places in 1983, but this did not significantly improve its fortunes. It was converted into a low-rent single room occupancy, with rooms rented by the week. It closed in 1998.

Renovation
In 2005, Jacksonville businessman Lamonte Carter initiated plans to purchase and restore 310 West Church Street. He had encountered the building when he happened to park in front of it on his way to an appointment. He contacted Easton, who had halted a plan to renovate the surrounding block after construction stalled on the Duval County Courthouse, located nearby. Carter's plan for 310 West Church, which would cost an estimated $8 million in private equity, government grants, and low-interest loans, involved converting the ground floor to commercial space and turning the top five floors into 50 unit apartments. Carter hoped the renovation will lead to a further collaboration with Easton to renovate the block.

Subsequently, the historic property was acquired by Axis Hotels LLC, which announced plans in 2018 to turn the building into a 4- or 5-star boutique hotel with 100 rooms and a rooftop bar. Axis also purchased the adjacent former Marine National Bank building at 404 North Julia Street, which the company plans to demolish to construct a 200-unit apartment building with 15,000 square feet of retail space.

References

External links

Apartment buildings in Florida
History of Jacksonville, Florida
National Register of Historic Places in Jacksonville, Florida
Residential buildings in Jacksonville, Florida
Residential buildings on the National Register of Historic Places in Florida
Hentz, Reid & Adler buildings
Northbank, Jacksonville
1923 establishments in Florida
Commercial buildings completed in 1923
Hotels in Jacksonville